is a passenger railway station operated by the Takamatsu-Kotohira Electric Railroad in Takamatsu, Kagawa, Japan.  It is operated by the private transportation company Takamatsu-Kotohira Electric Railroad (Kotoden) and is designated station "N05".

Lines
Kita-Higashiguchi Station is a station on the Kotoden Nagao Line and is located 3.4 km from the terminus of the line at Kawaramachi Station and 5.1 kilometers from Takamatsu-Chikkō Station.

Layout
The station consists of one island platform with a rain shelter; there is no station building. The platform is connected to the street by a level crossing. The station is unattended.

Adjacent stations

History
Kita-Higashiguchi Station opened on April 30, 1912  as a station on the Takamatsu Electric Tramway. On November 1, 1943 it became a station on the Takamatsu Kotohira Electric Railway.

Surrounding area
Takamatsu Municipal Kita Elementary School
Takamatsu Municipal Kita Minami Elementary School

Passenger statistics

See also
 List of railway stations in Japan

References

External links

  

Railway stations in Japan opened in 1912
Railway stations in Takamatsu